Mexico national field hockey team may refer to:
 Mexico men's national field hockey team
 Mexico women's national field hockey team